Mini Sivakumar was an Indian visual artist.

Early life and education
Mini Sivakumar was born in Trivandrum in 1962 and took her post-graduation in Zoology. She then pursued her post-doctoral research at Visva Bharati University. She was married to the eminent art historian, R. Siva Kumar.

Career
In 2001 she took art as a profession and had conducted different national and international shows. In the year 2008, she conducted a major solo show at Birla Akademy, Mumbai.

She is known for her "vibrancy of color and the dynamism of a creative outpouring"

Cancer and death
Mini died of breast cancer on 5 September 2010.

References

1961 births
2010 deaths
20th-century Indian painters
Painters from Kerala
Artists from Thiruvananthapuram
Indian women painters
20th-century Indian women